The Netherlands Antillean Football Union (or NAVU) was the governing body of football in the former Netherlands Antilles between September 1958 and February 2011. Its jurisdiction consisted of the islands of Curaçao, Bonaire and (until 1986) Aruba.

NAVU was established on 5 September 1958 following a merger between Aruba Football Federation (AVB) and Curaçao Football Association (CVB). The Bonaire Football Federation (BVB) later joined on 4 August 1963. The FIFA membership of CVB was transferred to NAFU in 1958.

NAVU was a founding member of CONCACAF in September 1961.

The Aruba Football Federation split from NAFU in 1986 and becoming a full member of CONCACAF and two years later, a full member of FIFA.

In February 2011, NAFU was succeeded by Federashon Futbol Korsou (FFK) following the dissolution of the Netherlands Antilles.

References

Netherlands Antilles
Football in the Netherlands Antilles
Football
1958 establishments in the Netherlands Antilles
2011 disestablishments in the Netherlands
Sports organizations established in 1958
Organizations disestablished in 2011

nl:Federashon di Futbol Korsou